The Walnut Valley Unified School District is located in the eastern portion of Los Angeles County and is a part of the Greater Los Angeles Area of the U.S. state of California. It serves the majority of Walnut, the southern portion of Diamond Bar and small portions of the City of Industry, Pomona, Rowland Heights and West Covina. The school district has been ranked by numerous sources to be one of the top public school districts in all of Southern California.

Schools
The district contains 9 elementary schools, 3 middle schools, 2 regular high schools, and 1 continuation high school.

Elementary schools
Castle Rock Elementary (Diamond Bar)
Collegewood Elementary (Walnut)
Cyrus J. Morris Elementary (Walnut)
Evergreen Elementary (Diamond Bar)
Leonard G. Westhoff Elementary (Walnut)
Maple Hill Elementary (Diamond Bar)
Quail Summit Elementary (Diamond Bar)
Vejar Elementary (Walnut)
Walnut Elementary (Walnut)

Middle schools
Chaparral Middle School (Diamond Bar)
South Pointe Middle School (Diamond Bar/Walnut)
Suzanne Middle School (Walnut)

High schools
Walnut High School (Walnut)
Diamond Bar High School (Diamond Bar)
Ron Hockwalt Academies (Walnut)

References

External links
 

School districts in Los Angeles County, California
Diamond Bar, California